John Peter Dillon (born 16 December 1978) is a former Scottish footballer who played for Clyde, Dumbarton, Stenhousemuir and Berwick Rangers.

Dillon married Sharon Crawford on 30 May 2009 at St Mary's Church, Duntocher, with the reception at Seamill Hydro Hotel on the Ayrshire coast. Their wedding was featured in the magazine Real Life Weddings.

References

1978 births
Scottish footballers
Dumbarton F.C. players
Clyde F.C. players
Stenhousemuir F.C. players
Berwick Rangers F.C. players
Scottish Football League players
Living people
Association football midfielders

External Links 

 Player profile at Dumbarton Sons Archive
 John Dillon player stats at Sockerbase